Eubulus is a genus of hidden snout weevils in the family of beetles known as Curculionidae. There are at least 200 described species in Eubulus.

See also
 List of Eubulus species

References

Further reading

 
 
 

Cryptorhynchinae
Articles created by Qbugbot